Ilione lineata  is a species of fly in the family Sciomyzidae. It is found in the  Palearctic . Ilione lineata  feeds obligately on pea mussels and finger nail clams (Sphaeriidae).

References

External links
Images representing Ilione lineata at BOLD

Sciomyzidae
Insects described in 1820
Muscomorph flies of Europe